Michael James Dodson  (born 10 April 1950) is an Aboriginal Australian barrister, academic, and member of the Yawuru people in the Broome area of the southern Kimberley region of Western Australia.

His brother is Pat Dodson, also a noted Aboriginal leader and a senator to Federal Parliament, representing Western Australia.

Biography 
Following his parents' death, he boarded at Monivae College, Hamilton, Victoria. He graduated with degrees in Jurisprudence and Law from Monash University in 1974, as the first Indigenous person to graduate from law in Australia. Following graduation, he worked as a criminal solicitor for the Victorian Aboriginal Legal Aid Service, and later as a criminal defence barrister at the Victorian Bar, where he still practises as a barrister specialising in native title. He has worked extensively as a legal adviser in native title and human rights, and as an academic in Indigenous law. He is currently Professor of Law at the Australian National University, as the director of its National Centre for Indigenous Studies, and has lectured as a visiting academic at the University of Arizona and Harvard University respectively. Dodson's efforts for the rights of indigenous people around the world in 2005 made him a member of United Nations Permanent Forum on Indigenous Issues.

He has been a prominent advocate of land rights and other issues affecting Indigenous peoples in Australia and globally and has extensive involvement in the United Nations Forum on Indigenous Issues. He is the Chief Investigator for the Serving Our Country: a history of Aboriginal and Torres Strait Islander people in the defence of Australia project, an Australian Research Council-funded research project based at The Australian National University.

On 25 January 2009, he was named Australian of the Year.  He now lives and works in Canberra. Apart from human rights Dodson has been active in politics of Australian government, justice and  crime prevention.

Honours
Australian of the Year, 2009
 Chairperson of the Australian Institute of Aboriginal and Torres Strait Islander Studies
Distinguished Alumni Award, Monash University, 1998
Fellow, Academy of the Social Sciences in Australia, 2009
Honorary Member of the University of Kingwood Nationals, 2010
Member of the Order of Australia (AM), 2003
Member of the Order of Indonesia (PM), awarded on New Year's Day 2003

Honorary doctorates
Honorary Doctor of Letters, University of Technology Sydney, 1998
Honorary Doctor of Laws, University of New South Wales, 1999
Honorary Doctorate, University of Canberra, 2010

Controversy
It is alleged that Mick Dodson verbally abused a woman at an NTFL game. The incident was investigated by the NT government but the outcome was not disclosed.

References

External links
ANU College of Law profile
Selected publications and presentations, Australian Institute of Aboriginal and Torres Strait Islander Studies

1950 births
Living people
Australian barristers
Australian human rights activists
Lawyers from Melbourne
Australian legal scholars
Australian lobbyists
Australian indigenous rights activists
Australian of the Year Award winners
Indigenous Australians from Western Australia
Monash Law School alumni
Members of the Order of Australia
People from Broome, Western Australia
People from the Australian Capital Territory
People from the Northern Territory
Fellows of the Academy of the Social Sciences in Australia
Academic staff of the Australian National University
Indigenous Australian academics
Australian republicans